Turtle Lake is a lake in Beltrami County, Minnesota, in the United States.

The outline of the lake roughly resembles a turtle, hence the name.

See also
List of lakes in Minnesota

References

Lakes of Minnesota
Lakes of Beltrami County, Minnesota